Alexandre Tinoco do Amaral (born December 3, 1982 in Rio de Janeiro) is a Brazilian sailor gold medallist in the Pan American Games, the Snipe World Championships, and the Snipe South American Championship; and silver medallist in the South American Games.

His brother, Mário Tinoco do Amaral, is also a World Junior champion (2007 and 2009) and South American champion (2013).

World Championships
 1st place in Snipe at Rungsted 2011.

South American Championship
 1st place in Snipe at Manta 2012.

Pan American Games
 1st place in Snipe at Guadalajara 2011.

South American Games
 2nd place in Snipe at Medellín 2010.

References

1982 births
Living people
Brazilian male sailors (sport)
Pan American Games gold medalists for Brazil
Sailors at the 2011 Pan American Games
Snipe class world champions
Pan American Games medalists in sailing
World champions in sailing for Brazil
South American Games silver medalists for Brazil
South American Games medalists in sailing
Competitors at the 2010 South American Games
Medalists at the 2011 Pan American Games
Sportspeople from Rio de Janeiro (city)
21st-century Brazilian people